Irene Pepinhege-Rozema (born 11 February 1941) is a West German sprint canoer who competed in the early to mid-1970s. She won three medals in the K-4 500 m event at the ICF Canoe Sprint World Championships with two silver in 1966 and 1971 and also a bronze in 1970.

Pepinhege also competed in three Summer Olympics, earning her best finish of fourth in the K-1 500 m event at Munich in 1972.

References

Sports-reference.com profile

1941 births
Canoeists at the 1972 Summer Olympics
Canoeists at the 1976 Summer Olympics
West German female canoeists
Living people
Olympic canoeists of West Germany
ICF Canoe Sprint World Championships medalists in kayak